Sun City Music Festival was an annual electronic music festival held over Labor Day weekend in El Paso, Texas at Ascarate Park. In its opening year, the festival was held at Cohen Stadium. The festival represents all genres of electronic music, bringing top international DJs and live acts from multiple countries along with local producers and radio personalities to three stages, one of them being the Beatport Stage. The festival was founded by SMG Events and Disco Donnie Presents. On May 9, 2018, it was announced through the Sun City Music Festival Twitter account that the festival would not be happening.

History

2011-2017 
In its inaugural year in 2011, an estimated 20,000 people attended to see artists Armin van Buuren, Afrojack, Wolfgang Gartner, Martin Solveig, and many others. In 2012, SCMF, as it is commonly known by attendees, moved to Ascarate Park. It has remained at Ascarate Park until its last occurrence in 2017.

Since 2018: Hiatus 
On May 2018, it was announced that Sun City Music Festival would not be held but that there were hopes of coming back in 2019. There was never a reason cited for why the festival was canceled, with SCMF's announcement only saying, "...the Disco and SMG teams work diligently to ensure every single time you enter the gates of Sun City Music Festival, the best possible experience awaits you. Throughout the calendar year, the SCMF team works extremely hard to meet this momentous task with rigorous standards in place. Unfortunately, we don’t believe that goal can be accomplished in 2018."   As of August 2020, the last update on the festival was by Disco Donnie stating: "*SCMF - its [sic] complicated *Starting A New Festival During a Pandemic - its [sic] complicated... Ascarate was nice enough to move my deposit and dates to 2021.  Buts [sic] its [sic] still going to be complicated."

2011 Lineup
 Afrojack
 Ambivalent
 Andy C & MC GQ
 Armin Van Buuren
 Chris Lake
 Chuckie
 Cookie Monsta
 Cosmic Gate
 Crystal Castles
 Dusty Kid
 Exceed
 Feed Me
 Funkagenda
 Gabriel & Dresden
 High Contrast
 Joachim Garraud
 LA Riots (DJ)
 Martin Solveig
 Nero
 Paul Van Dyk
 Sander Van Doorn
 Sidney Samson
 Showtek
 Sunnery James & Ryan Marciano
 Sub Focus
 Wolfgang Gartner
 Zedd

2012 Lineup

 David Guetta
 Zedd
 Flux Pavilion
 Knife Party
 Dada Life
 Above & Beyond
 Nicky Romero
 Dillon Francis
 Sander van Doorn
 Modestep
 John Dahlback
 Kill The Noise
 Morgan Page
 Gesaffelstein
 Downlink
 Joris Voorn
 Dirtyphonics
 Umek
 Brodinski
 Riva Starr
 M.A.N.D.Y
 Alvin Risk
 Crizzly
 Stefano Noferini
 Lucky Date
 Destructo
 Revolvr
 Audrey Napoleon
 Dirty Audio
 Gina Turner
 Kevin Focus
 Funk Agenda
 Nick Fanciulli

2013 Lineup

 Armin van Buuren
 Tiesto
 Steve Aoki
 Alesso
 Adventure Club
 Baauer
 Borgore
 Brodinski
 Candyland
 Cassy
 Crizzly
 Danny Avila
 Deniz Koyu
 Deorro
 Dillon Francis
 Dimitri Vegas & Like Mike
 Droog
 Eats Everything
 Flosstradamus
 French Fries (DJ)
 Gesaffelstein
 GTA
 John Digweed
 Just Blaze
 Kill Paris
 Le Castle Vania
 Markus Schulz
 Ookay
 Scuba
 Sebastien Leger
 Seven Lions
 Stefano Noferini
 TJR
 Zomboy

2014 Lineup

 Tiesto
 Martin Garrix
 David Guetta
 Above & Beyond
 Carnage
 Showtek
 W&W
 Aly & Fila
 Amin Edge & Dance
 Andrew Rayel
 Bryan Kearney
 Candyland
 Cash Cash
 Chris Lake
 Cosmic Gate
 Deorro
 Dubfire
 Headhunterz
 Hobo
 Hot Since 82
 Loco Dice
 Luminox
 M4SONIC
 Nicole Moudaber
 Ookay
 Orjan Nilsen
 Otto Knows
 Party Favor
 Paul van Dyk
 Sian
 Slander
 Spektre
 TJR
 Thomas Newson
 Zomboy

2015 Lineup
On May 20, 2015, it was reported that the lineup would consist of house, techno, trance, electro house, and other genres.

 Armin van Buuren
 Hardwell
 Adam Beyer
 Audien
 Borgore
 Borgeous
 Cashmere Cat
 Chris Liebing
 Dash Berlin
 Dubfire (Live)
 DVBBS
 Hot Since 82
 GTA
 NERVO
 Odesza
 Robin Schulz
 TJR
 Yellow Claw
 Zeds Dead
 Bixel Boys
 Botnek
 Brillz
 Claptone
 Coone
 Destructo
 Galantis
 Felix Cartal
 Jack Bass
 Jauz
 Kayzo
 Ida Engberg
 Lane 8
 Liquid Todd
 Morten
 Flower and The Snake
 Hector
 Oliver Dollar
 Riot Ten
 Shiba San
 Slander
 Trippy Turtle

2016 Lineup 
 Skrillex
 Kaskade
 The Chainsmokers
 Galantis
 Andrew Bayer
 Bro Safari
 Cash Cash
 Fedde Le Grand
 Gareth Emery
 Ghastly
 Ilan Bluestone
 Jauz
 Joris Voorn
 Loco Dice
 Malaa
 Marshmello
 Nghtmre
 Sam Feldt
 Sasha
 Seven Lions
 Snails
 SNBRN
 Wiwek
 Zomboy
 4B
 ANNA
 Boombox Cartel
 Butch
 CID
 Gardens of God
 Jeremy Olander
 Josh Wink
 Lee K
 Lny Tnz
 Matador
 Mind Against
 Pleasurekraft
 Tigerlily
 Unlike Pluto

2017 Lineup 
 Marshmello
 Above & Beyond
 Borgore
 Dirty South
 Don Diablo
 Dosem
 Drezo
 Getter
 G Jones
 Guy J
 Guy Mantzur
 Herobust
 Illenium
 Joyryde
 Latmun
 Louis the Child
 Malaa
 NGHTMRE
 Nicole Moudaber
 Ookay
 REZZ
 Sam Paganini
 SAYMYNAME
 Seven Lions
 Shaun Frank
 SLUSHII
 Snails
 Steve Lawler
 Tchami
 Timmy Trumpet
 Wax Motif
 Sasha & John Digweed

See also

List of electronic music festivals

References

External links
 

Music festivals in Texas
Electronic music festivals in the United States
Music festivals established in 2011